Gymnoclytia melanosoma is a North American species of tachinid flies in the genus Gymnoclytia of the family Tachinidae.

References

Phasiinae
Diptera of North America
Insects described in 1892
Taxa named by Frederik Maurits van der Wulp